Linnaea parvifolia, synonym Abelia schumannii, is a species of flowering plant in the family Caprifoliaceae, native to central China. Pink flowers with red calyces are produced in late summer and autumn.

In cultivation it requires a sheltered, south-facing aspect. It is valued as a late-flowering ornamental garden shrub.

References

Caprifoliaceae
Flora of China
Shrubs